Plagiorhegma is a monotypic genus of flowering plants belonging to the family Berberidaceae. The only species is Plagiorhegma dubium.

Its native range is Russian Far East to Korea.

References

Berberidaceae
Berberidaceae genera
Monotypic Ranunculales genera